Dreaming of Julia (Cuba Libre) is a 2003 film directed by Juan Gerard. The debut film by the director, the story is based on Gerard's childhood life in Cuba. The film was released as Cuban Blood in the US. This film was initially released on 27 January 2006 at Mexico, which directed by Juan Gerard with a budget of 108.6 million USD.

Plot
Set in Cuba in 1958, the last year of Fulgencio Batista regime, the plot revolves around a boy who is torn between his friendship with a blonde American named Julia and the strife facing his family as a result of the revolution and turmoil in their nation.

Cast
 Harvey Keitel as "Che"
 Iben Hjejle as Julia
 Andhy Méndez as Boy
 Diana Bracho as Beta
 Gael García Bernal as Ricky
 Aline Küppenheim as Katia
 Cecilia Suárez as Dulce
 Héctor Then as Captain Rosado's Bodyguard 1
 Ramses Cairo as Captain Rosado's Bodyguard 2
 Marilyn Romero as Tia Candita
 Gyana Mella as The Hooker

Production

The movie was entirely filmed in the Dominican Republic, in 2000.

References

External links
Official site

2003 films
Films set in the 1950s
Films set in 1958
Films set in Cuba
2003 comedy-drama films
English-language Dominican Republic films
Films shot in the Dominican Republic
2000s English-language films